Something is the second full-length album by American indie band Chairlift in the United States via the Columbia Records on January 24, 2012, and in the United Kingdom via Young Turks on January 23, 2012. The first album since founding member Aaron Pfenning left the band in 2010, Something features production from Dan Carey and Alan Moulder. The first single, "Amanaemonesia", was released  as a 7" on August 16, 2011 via Terrible Records. In March, 2012, an interactive video for "Met Before" was released. The video, directed by Jordan Fish, allows the viewer to determine the direction the main character takes.

Track listing

Reception

Something has been well received by music critics. In its first week, Something reached #184 on the Billboard 200 chart and #5 on the Top Heatseekers chart.

The album was listed 9th on Stereogum's list of top 50 albums of 2012.

I Belong In Your Arms was ranked 95th tracks in the 200 Best Tracks of the Decade So Far in 2014  by Pitchfork.

Charts

References

2012 albums
Chairlift (band) albums
Albums produced by Dan Carey (record producer)
Kanine Records albums
Young Turks (record label) albums